USS Montauk (SP-392) was a trawler acquired by the U.S. Navy during World War I. She was outfitted as a coastal minesweeper and was assigned to the 6th Naval District based at Charleston, South Carolina. During a gale off the southeast coast of the United States, she ran aground on Cumberland Island and was destroyed, with a loss of life of seven of her crew.

Built in Delaware 

The second ship to be so named by the U.S. Navy, Montauk (SP 392), built originally at Kennebunk, Maine, in 1880, was rebuilt at Wilmington, Delaware, in 1905; and acquired by the Navy through purchase from the Fisheries Products Company, Wilmington, North Carolina, 17 August 1917.

World War I service 

Placed in service as a coastal minesweeper soon thereafter, Montauk patrolled the coastline of the 6th Naval District until 21 August 1918.

Run aground and lost 

Cruising at that time off the Georgia and Florida coast, Montauk was lost, with seven of her crew, when she ran aground and foundered at Cumberland Island, one of the barrier islands off the Georgia coast—known as the Sea Islands—in a northeasterly gale.

References 
  
 NavSource Online: Montauk (SP 392)

Ships built in Kennebunk, Maine
1880 ships
Minesweepers of the United States Navy
World War I minesweepers of the United States
Cumberland Island